Vivian Keulards (born 1970) is a Dutch photographer. She attended the Fotoacademie Amsterdam. In 2019 her book To Hans was published by Schilt Publishing.

Her work is included in the collections of the Museum of Fine Arts Houston and the Colorado Photographic Arts Center.

References

Living people
1953 births
20th-century Dutch photographers
21st-century Dutch photographers
20th-century Dutch women artists
21st-century Dutch women artists